Hood Grange is a hamlet and civil parish in the Hambleton district of North Yorkshire, England. The population was less than 100 in the 2011 Census, so details are included in the civil parish of Sutton-under-Whitestonecliffe. The population of the parish was estimated at 10 in 2015. It is located near Thirsk at the foot of Sutton Bank, south of the larger village of Sutton-under-Whitestonecliffe and next to Hood Hill, which is to the south. It is notable for consisting of only a single household after its population decreased rapidly in the late 19th century.  Hood Grange has existed as a civil parish since 1866, prior to which the area was part of Kilburn. A monastery known as Hood Abbey existed here from before 1138 until its dissolution in the 16th century.

References

External links

 Vision of Britain entry on Hood Grange

Villages in North Yorkshire
Civil parishes in North Yorkshire